Parapercis bicoloripes is a fish species in the sandperch family, Pinguipedidae. 
It is found in Vietnam. 

References

Pinguipedidae
Taxa named by Artem Mikhailovich Prokofiev
Fish described in 2010
Fish of Vietnam